Pyotr Nilovich Demichev (3 January 191810 August 2010) was a Soviet and Russian politician. He was First Deputy Chairman of the Presidium of the Supreme Soviet from 1986 to 1988 and Minister of Culture from 1974 to 1986. He was a deputy Politburo member from 1964 until his retirement in 1988. He was considered to be a "Communist Party ideologist" with little sympathy for liberal movements within the Soviet Union.

References 

1918 births
2010 deaths
People from Kirovsky District, Kaluga Oblast
D. Mendeleev University of Chemical Technology of Russia alumni
Academic staff of the D. Mendeleev University of Chemical Technology of Russia
Fifth convocation members of the Supreme Soviet of the Soviet Union
Sixth convocation members of the Soviet of the Union
Seventh convocation members of the Soviet of the Union
Eighth convocation members of the Soviet of the Union
Ninth convocation members of the Soviet of the Union
Tenth convocation members of the Soviet of the Union
Eleventh convocation members of the Soviet of the Union
Members of the Supreme Soviet of the Soviet Union
Culture ministers of the Soviet Union
Politburo of the Central Committee of the Communist Party of the Soviet Union candidate members
Secretariat of the Central Committee of the Communist Party of the Soviet Union members
Recipients of the Gold Cross of Merit (Poland)
Recipients of the Order of Lenin
Recipients of the Order of the Red Banner of Labour